The Cochabamba grass mouse (Akodon siberiae) is a species of rodent in the family Cricetidae.
It is found only in Bolivia.
Its natural habitat is subtropical or tropical moist lowland forests.

References

Musser, G. G. and M. D. Carleton. 2005. Superfamily Muroidea. pp. 894–1531 in Mammal Species of the World a Taxonomic and Geographic Reference. D. E. Wilson and D. M. Reeder eds. Johns Hopkins University Press, Baltimore.

Akodon
Mammals of Bolivia
Mammals described in 1989
Taxonomy articles created by Polbot